The following are the football (soccer) events of the year 1918 throughout the world.

Events
Due to the First World War several European leagues remain suspended.

Winners club national championship
Argentina: Racing Club
Austria: Floridsdorfer AC
Belgium: no national championship
Denmark: KB
England: no national championship
France: no national championship
Germany: no national championship
Hungary: MTK Hungária FC
Iceland: Fram
Italy: no national championship
Luxembourg: CS Fola Esch
Netherlands: Ajax Amsterdam
Paraguay: Cerro Porteño
Scotland:
Division One: Rangers F.C.
Scottish Cup: No competition
Sweden: IFK Göteborg
Uruguay: Peñarol
Greece: 1913 to 1921 - no championship titles due to the First World War and the Greco-Turkish War of 1919-1922.

Births 
 May 18 – Franjo Wölfl, Croatian and Yugoslavian international footballer (died 1987)
 October 24 – Rafael Iriondo, Spanish international footballer and manager (died 2016)
 December 16 – Pierita (Andrés Domínguez Candal), Spanish footballer (died 1978)

Deaths

References 

 
Association football by year